Gaetano Iannuzzi (born 5 March 1972) is an Italian rowing coach and former coxswain who later participated as a coxswain in the paralympic sport, also winning an international medal in the competitions reserved for paralympic athletes.

Biography
After finished his sports career as an athlete, Iannuzzi had become a rowing coach. He became a paralympic athlete in 2017 following a serious road accident had in 1998, however continued to compete with not disabled athletes until 2009.

He has had a long career, and last competed in 2017, when he won bronze at the 2017 Championships in Sarasota, Florida in PR3 mixed coxed four, an adaptive rowing class. At young level he won a gold medal at the 1991 World Rowing Championships in Vienna with the lightweight men's eight. 

From 1999 to 2009 Iannuzzi participated in sixteen editions of World Rowing Championships.

Achievements

See also
 Italy at the 2000 Summer Olympics
 Italy at the 2004 Summer Olympics

References

External links
 
 Gaetano Iannuzzi at Italian Rowing Federation

1972 births
Living people
Italian male rowers
World Rowing Championships medalists for Italy
Coxswains (rowing)
Olympic rowers of Italy
Rowers at the 2000 Summer Olympics
Rowers at the 2004 Summer Olympics
Paralympic athletes of Italy
Italian sports coaches